The Queensland Music Awards (commonly known as QMA and known as the Q Song Awards from 2006 to 2010) are annual awards celebrating Queensland's emerging artists. They commenced in 2006.
 
Each year, the QMA Song of the Year is immortalised in a plaque on Fortitude Valley's Walk of Fame in the Brunswick Street Mall.

2006 Q Song Awards
The 2006 Q Song Awards winners.
 
Major awards
 Song of the Year - "Unsettle My Heart" by The Boat People
 Published song of the Year - "Songbird" by Bernard Fanning
 Grant McLennan Lifetime Achievement Award – "Cattle and Cane" by Grant McLennan
 QMusic Encouragement Award - "Don't You Choose Me" by Kate Bradley
 
Genre awards
 Blues and Roots - "Honey Don't" by The Gin Club
 Country - "Better Off" by Chris Pickering
 Electronic / Dance - "Tin Cat" by My Ninja Lover
 Hip Hop - "Analgestic" (remix) by The Winner Coopers
 Indigenous - "Native Language" Song by Freddie Shortjoe
 Jazz - "Mesmerisation" by Sean Foran
 Mixed / Alternative - "Jackie Marshall" by Jackie Marshall
 Pop - "Apartment" by Kate Miller-Heidke
 Punk Metal - "Plausible Deniability" by Monkeybone
 Regional - "Feel No More" by Dr Octopus
 Rhythm & Blues - "Pulp Funky" by Dakuta
 Rock - "Friendly Fire" by 26
 World / Folk - "Times Like These" by Women in Docs
 Primary School - "Listen to Me" by Christalla Pippos
 Secondary School - "What Is It?" by Sean Gagen
 
People's Choice Award
 The Courier-Mail People's Choice Award - "Unsettle My Heart" by The Boat People

2007 Q Song Awards
The 2007 Q Song Awards took place on 14 August 2007. The winners are listed below.
 
Major awards
 Song of the Year - "Not the Same" by Tim Stewart
 Published song of the Year - "Science Is Golden" by The Grates
 Grant McLennan Lifetime Achievement Award - Kev Carmody
 QMusic Encouragement Award - Danny Widdicombe
 
Genre awards
 Alternative - "Not the Same" by Tim Stewart
 Blues and Roots - "Dust" by Mason Rack and Steve Balbi
 Country - "The Humming Song" by Chris Pickering
 Electronic / Dance - "Make Amends" by PTY LTD
 Gospel Spiritual - "Just a Dreamer" by Jamie Wells
 Hip Hop - "Beats from the East" by Briztronix
 Indigenous - "Abacus" by Luke Peacock
 Jazz – "Time to Be" by Louise Denson and Ingrid James
 Pop - "Shoebox" by Keir Nuttall
 Punk Metal – "The Lords Wine Press" by The Quickening
 Regional - "How Is It" by The McMenamins
 Rock - "No Start/Red Light" by Kate Bradley
 World / Folk - "See the Smoke" by Andrew Morris
 Primary School - "Crickey Mate" by Terry Reid and the children of 7R, Trinity Anglican School
 Secondary School - "Kim's Song" by Emma Louise Lobb
 
People's Choice Award
 The Courier-Mail People's Choice Award - "Kim's Song" by Emma Louise Lobb

2008 Q Song Awards
The 2008 Q Song Awards took place in August 2008 at The Tivoli in Fortitude Valley. The event was hosted by Richard Fidler and Vijay Khurana. The winners are listed below.
 
Major awards
 Song of the Year - "Ten Paces Away" (written by Ben Salter) by The Gin Club 
 Published song of the Year - "From Ghost Town" by Robert Forster
 Grant McLennan Lifetime Achievement Award - Mike Chapman
 Billy Thorpe Scholarship Award - Michael Gavriel Rose
 
Genre awards
 Songs of Applewood and QMusic - "Maybe We've Met Before" by Steve Grady
 Alternative - "Til You Come Home" by James Grehan
 Blues and Roots - "Yellow Moon" by 8 Ball Aitken
 Country - "Dusty Boots" by Shari Williams
 Electronic New Music - "Watching It Unfold" by Lawrence English
 Folk and Ballad - "You Me and the Sea" by Ben Salter
 Gospel & Spiritual - "The Family Song" by Tyrone Noonan
 Hip Hop - "Common Ground" by Contact Crew
 Indigenous - "Power" by Mathew Devitt
 Jazz – "Reaching Out" by Sean Foran
 Pop - "Strawberry Wine" by Scott Bromiley and Tim Morrissey
 Punk Metal – "Dearly Beloved" by Torn Asunder
 Regional - "Til You Come Home" by James Grehan
 Rock - "Ten Paces Away" by Ben Salter
 World / Folk - "Crane Song" by Tenzin Choegyal
 Primary School - "Love Chime" by Jazz D'Arcy
 Secondary School - "The Boat Song" by Jonno Garcia & Shaun Pryor
 
People's Choice Award
 The Courier-Mail People's Choice Award  - "Til You Come Home" by James Grehan

2009 Q Song Awards
The winners are listed below.
 
Major awards
 Song of the Year – "Danshyttan" by Timothy Carroll
 Published song of the Year – "Big Big Love" by Troy Cassar-Daley
 Grant McLennan Lifetime Achievement Award – The Bee Gees
 QMusic Encouragement Award – "Tip Toes" by Ange Takats
 Billy Thorpe Scholarship Award – Alan Boyle
 
Genre awards
 Alternative – "Set It Right" by Hungry Kids of Hungary
 Blues and Roots – "Heavy Stuff" by Claire Whiting
 Country - "Outback Booty Call" by 8 Ball Aitken
 Folk and Ballad – "Danshyttan" by Timothy Carroll
 Gospel & Spiritual – "Holy Love" by Bec Shuker
 Hip Hop & R&B – Bubblegum by Mr Laneous
 Indigenous – "What's Going On?" by Lucas Proudfoot
 Jazz – "The Walls" by Hannah Macklin and Steve Newcomb
 New World & Experimental – "2004" by Benjamin Thompson
 Pop – "Rainbow Kraut" by Tim Morrissey, Scott Bromiley and Peter Bernoth
 Punk – "Boredoms" by Benjamin Thompson
 Regional – "Karanda Reggae" by Adem Brim
 Rock – "Bring On the Colour Guard" by Nick O'Donnell, Drew Fellows, Ross Duckworth and Iain Wilson
 World / Folk – "Bom Fazer" by Anje West and Owen Newcomb
 Primary School – "Country Outback Girl" by Romany Elmas
 Secondary School – "City" by Andrew Redford
 
People's Choice Award
 The Courier-Mail People's Choice Award – "Baby You've Changed" by Ben Carstens, Simon Radich, Matt Tanner and Adam Toole

2010 Q Song Awards
The 2010 Q Song Awards took place on 10 August 2010 at The Tivoli in Fortitude Valley. The event was hosted by Richard Fidler and Sarah Howells. The winners are listed below.
 
Major awards
 Song of the Year - "Wrist Watch" by Hungry Kids of Hungary
 Published song of the Year - "I Don't Even Know Where to Start" by David McCormack
 Grant McLennan Lifetime Achievement Award - Carol Lloyd
 QMusic Encouragement Award - "Today’s Song" by The Cairos
 Billy Thorpe Scholarship Award - Andrew Redford
 
Genre awards
 Alternative - "Wrist Watch" by Hungry Kids of Hungary
 Blues and Roots - "Falling" by James Grehan
 Country - "Country Town" by The Duke Wilde Band
 Dance / Electronic - "Kafka Remixed" by Peter Golikov
 Folk and Ballad - "Classified (WVTM)" by Mardi Lumsden
 Gospel & Spiritual - "Messiah" by Eric Ossebaar
 Indigenous - "Paint My Cup" by Busby Marou
 Jazz – "Jazz" by Sean Foran
 Pacific Island - "One to Wait" by Charles Wall
 Pop - "Firestarter" by Dan Parsons
 Punk – "The Oh Yeah" by The Villains of Wilhelm
 Regional - "Falling" by James Grehan
 Rock - "Getting Wise" by Michael Tomlinson
 Urban - "The Soul of Troubadour" by Impossible Odds
 World / Folk - "The Owl, The Fairy and the Grasshopper" by Alesa Lajana Borsboom
 Primary School - "Daddy" by Jessica Coleman
 Secondary School - "Rain" by Kahlia Ferguson
 
People's Choice Award
 The Courier-Mail People's Choice Award - "Every June" by My Fiction

2011 Queensland Music Awards
The 2011 QMA Awards took place on 16 August 2011 at the Old Museum Building, Brisbane. The event was hosted by Richard Fidler and Sarah Howells. It featured performances from Elixir featuring Katie Noonan, Emma Louise, The Medics, DZ Deathrays, Streamer Bendy and the students from Brisbane's Aboriginal Centre of Performing Arts. The winners are listed below.
 
Major awards
 Song of the Year - "Jungle" by Emma Louise
 Album of the Year - I Want That You Are Always Happy by The Middle East
 Grant McLennan Lifetime Achievement Award - Bill Hauritz
 Export Achievement Award - Kate Miller-Heidke
 Billy Thorpe Scholarship Award – Sam Hales
 
Genre awards
 Blues and Roots - "One Step" by Kooii
 Country - "Move Into the City" by James Blundell
 Dance / Electronic - "The Stars Have Aligned" by DieVsCity
 Folk - "1000 Sundowns" by Emma Louise
 Heavy - "A Burning Horizon" by Tria Mera
 Indigenous - "Beggars" by The Medics
 Jazz – "Saudade" by Roberto Iregui (with Marially Pacheco)
 Pop - "Jungle" by Emma Louise
 Rock - "Gebbie Street" by DZ Deathrays
 Urban - "Robots" by Schoolfight
 World  - "Between the Green and Blue" by The Barleyshakes
 Schools (Grade 6-12) - "Ode to Abigail" by Stephen Smith
 
People's Choice Awards
 The Courier-Mail People's Choice Award Most Popular Male - "The Coward" by Ben Salter
 The Courier-Mail People's Choice Award Most Popular Female - "Caught in the Crowd" by Kate Miller Heidke
 The Courier-Mail People's Choice Award Most Popular Group - "Youngbloods" by The Amity Affliction

2012 Queensland Music Awards
The 2012 QMA Awards took place on 14 August 2012 at the Old Museum Building, Brisbane. The event was hosted by Katie Noonan and Sarah Howells.
 
The winners are listed below.
Major awards
 Song of the Year - "Do You Hear" by Cub Sport
 Album of the Year – The Cat by Ben Salter
 Grant McLennan Lifetime Achievement Award - Ed Kuepper
 Export Achievement Award - DZ Deathrays
 Billy Thorpe Scholarship Award - Astrid and The Asteroids
 
Genre awards
 Blues & Roots - "Golden" by Band of Frequencies
 Children's Music - "The Hopping Mouse" by The Lamplights
 Country - "Precious Little" by Harmony James
 Dance / Electronic - "M&R" by Bec Laughton
 Folk - "Raisin Heart" by Mosman Alder
 Heavy - "Dawn to Rise" by A Breach of Silence
 Indigenous - "Red Roses" by Sue Ray
 Jazz – "Dresden" by Marially Pacheco
 Pop - "Do You Hear" by Cub Sport
 Regional - "Rainstrom" by Jordan Brodie
 Rock - "Winter Was the Time" by Jeremy Neale
 Urban - "The Valley" by Rainman
 World - "Panini Fandango" by Lüke
 Schools (Grade 6-12) - "You Could Be Happy" by Sahara Beck
 
People's Choice Awards
 The Courier-Mail People's Choice Award Most Popular Male - Pete Murray
 The Courier-Mail People's Choice Award Most Popular Female - Kate Miller Heidke
 The Courier-Mail People's Choice Award Most Popular Group - The Grates

2013 Queensland Music Awards
The 2013 QMA Awards took place on 13 August 2013 at Tivoli Theatre in Brisbane. 21 awards were distributed.
The winners are listed below.
Major awards
 Song of the Year - "Surrender" by Ball Park Music
 Album of the Year – vs Head vs Heart by Emma Louise
 Export Achievement Award - Emma Louise
 
Genre awards
 Blues & Roots - "Fallen Empire" by Kingfisha
 Children's Music - "Shake it Down" by Nadia Sunde
 Country - "EmmyLou’s Guitar" by Harmony James
 Dance / Electronic - "Snarly" by MKO
 Folk - "Minnesota" by Ange Takats
 Heavy - "Chasing Ghosts" by The Amity Affliction
 Indigenous - "Rosie" by Thelma Plum
 Jazz – "The Alligator Escalator" by Andrew Butt Trio +
 Pop - "Surrender" by Ball Park Music
 Regional - "Jacky Kneebone" by Jayson Watkin
 Rock - "Six Months in a Cast" by The Trouble With Templeton
 Urban - "Let There Be Hope" by BlaqCarrie featuring Adam George
 Video - "XO" by Georgia Potter
 World - "Pollito " by The Saruzu Quartet
 Schools (Grade 6-12) - "I Cannot Lie" by Kimberley Terrace
 
People's Choice Awards
 The Courier-Mail People's Choice Award Most Popular Male - "In Strange Times" by  Jeremy Neal
 The Courier-Mail People's Choice Award Most Popular Female - "Boy" by Emma Louise
 The Courier-Mail People's Choice Award Most Popular Group - "I Am What You Want Me to Be" by   The Jungle Giants

2014 Queensland Music Awards
There were no awards in 2014, resetting the date cycle. The awards were moved from August to March for 2015, and awards are given for released in the preceding year. In October 2014, Executive Officer for QMusic Denise Foley said "QMusic is excited to begin the application process for the QMAs, and celebrate the new timing of the Awards moving to the annual date of March in 2015. We wanted to ensure that the finalists and winners were given the uncompromised attention that they deserve."

2015 Queensland Music Awards
The 2015 QMA Awards took place on 30 March 2015 at Brisbane Powerhouse and hosted by Sarah Howells and Fred Leone. 22 awards were distributed. The winners are listed below.
 
Major awards
 Song of the Year - "Dulcify" by Halfway
 Album of the Year – Hungry Ghost by Violent Soho
 Grant McLennan Lifetime Achievement Award - Mick Medew
 Billy Thorpe Scholarship Award - Ayla
 
Self-Nominating Awards
 Blues & Roots - "Bearing the Crown" by Leanne Tennant
 Children's Music - "Hungry Crocodile Chomp" by The Kangagang
 Country - "Dulcify" by Halfway
 Dance / Electronic - "Short Term Plan" by Michelle Xen
 Folk - "Live Like I’m Dying" by Quintessential Doll
 Heavy - "Numbers" by Guards of May
 Indigenous - "Wake Up" by The Medics
 Jazz – "Closing Time" by Laique
 Pop - "Wasted Pilots" by Airling
 Regional - "To the Sky" by The Vernons
 Rock - "Holiday Home" by The Grates
 Urban - "None the Wiser" by Dubmarine
 Video - "Arcadia" by The Kite String Tangle (directed by Daniel Harley)
 World - "Enfants du Chemin (Children of the Road) " by MZAZA
 Schools (Grade 6-12) - "Day’s of Doom" by Saskia
 
People's Choice Awards
 The BOQ People's Choice Award Most Popular Male – Bobby Alu
 The BOQ People's Choice Award Most Popular Female – Sahara Beck
 The BOQ People's Choice Award Most Popular Group - The Amity Affliction

2016 Queensland Music Awards 
The 2016 QMA Awards took place on 21 March 2016 at Brisbane Powerhouse and hosted by Gen Fricker. The winners are listed below.
 
Major awards
 Song of the Year - "Like Soda" by Violent Soho
 Album of the Year - Illegals in Heaven by Blank Realm
 Grant McLennan Lifetime Achievement Award - Noel Mengel
 Billy Thorpe Scholarship Award – Luke Peacock
 Export Achievement Award – Sheppard
 
Acknowledgements
Highest Selling Single – "Do You Remember" by Jarryd James
Highest Selling Album – The Veronicas by The Veronicas
 
Self-Nominating Awards
 Blues & Roots - "Impolite" by Bearfoot
 Children's Music - "Kangaroo Dance a Roo" by Carolyn Simpson & The Kangagang
 Country - "Spinning Wheels" by Dana Hassall
 Dance / Electronic - "Tenderness" by Standby Empire
 Folk - "Mother Mother" by Sahara Beck
 Heavy - "Marigold" by Caligula's Horse
 Indigenous - "Fruits of Our Labour" by Luke Peacock
 Jazz – "Hope in My Pocket" by Sean Foran, Rafael Karlen & Kristin Berardi
 Pop - "Golden Fleece" by Amy Shark
 Regional - "Waiting" by Ayla
 Rock - "Like Soda" by Violent Soho
 Urban - "Move Actively" by Astro Travellers
 Video - "TV" by Eves the Behavior (directed by Hannah Karydas, Adam Spark)
 World - "NIGHTWATCH" by MZAZA
 Schools (Grade 6-12) - "Pristine" by Doolie
 
People's Choice Awards
 The BOQ People's Choice Award Most Promising Male Songwriter – Joe Agius (The Creases)
 The BOQ People's Choice Award Most Promising Female Songwriter – Deena
 The BOQ People's Choice Award Most Promising Song Writing Team - Avaberée

2017 Queensland Music Awards 
The 2017 QMA Awards took place on 27 March 2017 at the Brisbane Powerhouse. 24 awards were distributed. The winners are listed below.
 
Major awards
 Song of the Year - "Adore" by Amy Shark
 Album of the Year - Waco by Violent Soho
 Grant McLennan Lifetime Achievement Award - Ritchie Yorke
 Billy Thorpe Scholarship Award – Marville (Ash Kerley)
 Export Achievement Award – The Amity Affliction
 
Acknowledgements
 Highest Selling Single – "In My Blood" by The Veronicas
 Highest Selling Album – This Could Be Heartbreak by The Amity Affliction
 
Self-Nominating Awards
 Blues & Roots - "Gentle Annie" by Leanne Tennant
 Country - "Three in and There’s Nothing But the Stars" by Halfway
 Electronic - "Boyfriend (Repeat)" by Confidence Man
 Folk - "Vague Utopia" by Tia Gostelow
 Heavy – "Drink the Rum" by Lagerstein
 Indigenous - "Ngayuwa Nalyelyingminama (I Love You)" by Emily Wurramara
 Jazz – "Une Fille" by Sean Foran
 Pop - "Adore" by Amy Shark
 Regional - "Adore" by Amy Shark
 Rock - "Poverty Line" by Good Boy
 Urban - "Wild Heart" by Romy
 Video - "Boredom" by Hey Geronimo (directed by Ross Pearson, Pete Kilroy)
 World - "Aware"  by High Life
 Schools (Grade 6-12) - "State of Art" by Tia Gostelow
 
People's Choice Awards
 The BOQ People's Choice Award  for Most Popular Male artist – Jarryd James
 The BOQ People's Choice Award  for Most Popular Female artist -  Dami Im
 The BOQ People's Choice Award  for Most Popular Group - Cub Sport

2018 Queensland Music Awards 
The 2018 QMA Awards took place on 14 May 2018 at the Royal International Convention Centre, Brisbane. 23 awards were distributed. The winners are listed below.
 
Major awards
 Song of the Year - "Dancin' & Romancin'" by Jeremy Neale
 Album of the Year - Quiet Ferocity by The Jungle Giants
 Grant McLennan Lifetime Achievement Award - Chad Morgan
 Billy Thorpe Scholarship Award – Greta Stanley
 Export Achievement Award – Amy Shark
 
Acknowledgements
Highest Selling Single – "Adore" by Amy Shark
Highest Selling Album – Ripcord by Keith Urban
 
Self-Nominating Awards
 Blues & Roots - "Blood to Give" by Karl S Williams
 Country - "Well Dressed Man" by Brad Butcher
 Electronic - "The Prize" by The Kite String Tangle (featuring Bridgette Amofah)
 Heavy – "Ethereal" by The Brave
 Hip Hop / Rap – "Put Me On" by Crooked White
 Indigenous - "Ngayuwa Nalyelyingminama (I Love You)" by Emily Wurramara
 Jazz – "Asset or Liability" by Trichotomy
 Pop - "Weekends" by Amy Shark
 Regional - "Weekends" by Amy Shark
 Rock - "Dancin’ & Romancin’" by Jeremy Neale
 Singer / Songwriter – Amy Shark
 Soul / Folk / R&B - "Without You" by Eleea Navarro
 Video - "Same Same" by Waax  (directed by Gregory Kelly, Pernell Marsden)
 World - "Junior Was His Name" by Sue Ray
 Schools (Grade 6-12) - "Something Real" by Xander Holmes
 
People's Choice Awards
Metro Venue of the Year – The Tivoli, Brisbane
Regional Venue of the Year - Solbar
Festival of the Year – Big Pineapple Music Festival

2019 Queensland Music Awards 
The 2019 QMA Awards took place on 19 March 2019 at the Royal International Convention Centre, Brisbane. The event was hosted by Patience Hodgson and Mel Buttle. 23 awards were distributed. The winners are listed below.
 
Major awards
 Song of the Year - "Dreaming" by Clea
 Album of the Year - Thick Skin by Tia Gostelow
 Grant McLennan Lifetime Achievement Award - Seaman Dan
 Billy Thorpe Scholarship Award – Pool Shop
 Export Achievement Award – Confidence Man
 
Acknowledgements
Highest Selling Single – "I Said Hi" by Amy Shark
Highest Selling Album – Love Monster by Amy Shark
 
Self-Nominating Awards
 Blues & Roots - "Tap Sticks" by Emily Wurramara
 Country - "Wild Heart" by Emma Beau
 Electronic - "Give it Time" by The Kite String Tangle (featuring Aalias)
 Heavy – "The Armour You Own" by Dead Letter Circus
 Hip Hop / Rap – "Pack Your Bags" by Resin Dogs
 Indigenous - "Lady Blue" by Emily Wurramara
 Jazz – "Long Black" by The Biology of Plants
 Pop - "Dreaming" by Clea
 Regional - "Here We Go Again" by Sahara Beck
 Rock - "Used to Be in Love" by The Jungle Giants
 Singer / Songwriter – "I Said Hi" by Amy Shark
 Soul / Folk / R&B - "The Sound of Light" by Mark Peric
 Video - "Ghost in the Machine" by Buttah
 World / Folk - "Everybody Talks" by Asha Jefferies
 Schools (Grade 6-12) - "Little Things" by Tokyo Twilight (featuring DVNA)
 
People's Choice Awards
 Metro Venue of the Year – The Triffid, Brisbane
 Regional Venue of the Year - Night Quarter
 Festival of the Year – Big Pineapple Music Festival

2020 Queensland Music Awards 
The 2020 QMA Awards took place on 3 March 2020 at the Fortitude Music Hall in Brisbane and included performances from The night featured performances from Jaguar Jonze, Cub Sport, Nat Dunn, Busby Marou and Order Sixty6. The winners are listed below.
 
Major awards
 Song of the Year - "Heavy Hearted" by The Jungle Giants
 Album of the Year - Better in Blak by Thelma Plum
 Grant McLennan Lifetime Achievement Award - Brentyn ‘Rollo’ Rollason
 Billy Thorpe Scholarship Award – Harry Phillips
 Export Achievement Award – Nat Dunn
 QMusic Honorary Award – Denis Handlin (in recognition of his 50-year tenure at Sony Music Entertainment)
Emerging Artist of the Year – Hope D
 
Acknowledgements
Highest Selling Single – "Mess Her Up" by Amy Shark
Highest Selling Album – Life by Conrad Sewell
 
Self-Nominating Awards
 Blues & Roots - "Naba Norem (The Reef Song)" by Busby Marou
 Country - "Give It a Miss" by Oh Harlow
 Electronic - "P()l4r" by The Kite String Tangle
 Heavy – "Still No Change" by DZ Deathrays
 Hip Hop / Rap – "Sele" by Carmouflage Rose
 Indigenous - "Arrived" by Mau Power (featuring Marcus Corowa)
 Jazz – "Monkey" by Sean Foran
 Pop - "Heavy Hearted" by The Jungle Giants
 Regional - "Bring It All Back" by Leanne Tennant
 Rock - "Just Exist" by Eliza & The Delusionals
 Singer / Songwriter – "Beijing Baby" by Jaguar Jonze
 Soul / Folk / R&B - "Soul Fruit" by Pink Matter
 Video - "P()l4r" by The Kite String Tangle
 World Music award - "Make Everything" by Matt Hsu's Obscure Orchestra
 Schools (Grade 6-12) - "Wired" by Hanni
 
People's Choice Awards
 Metro Venue of the Year – The Triffid, Brisbane
 Regional Venue of the Year - Solbar
 Festival of the Year – Big Pineapple Music Festival

2021 Queensland Music Awards 
The 2021 QMAs took place at the Fortitude Music Hall on 5 May 2021. The winners are listed below.

Major Awards
Song of the Year - "Dribble" by Sycco
Album of the Year - Ball Park Music by Ball Park Music
Export Achievement Award - Sheppard 
Billy Thorpe Scholarship - Beckah Amani
Grant McLennan Lifetime Achievement Award - Lynette Irwin
Emerging Artist of the Year - Beckah Amani
 
Acknowledgements
Highest Selling Single - "Everybody Rise" by Amy Shark
Highest Selling Album - The Speed of Now Part 1 by Keith Urban
Innovation Award - Troubadour Wagons

Self-Nominating Awards
Blues / Roots Award - "God Is a Bomb" by Karl S Williams
Children's Music Award - "Love Everybody" by Nyssa Ray 
Contemporary Classical Award - Moonlight Illusion by Ray Lin 
Country Award - "Like Hank Would" by Melody Moko
Electronic / Dance Award - "Juice" by Young Franco featuring Pell
Folk / Singer Songwriter Award - "Murder" by Jaguar Jonze
Heavy Award - "White Lies" by These Four Walls
Hip Hop / Rap Award - "Venom" by Jesswar 
Indigenous Award - "Twisting Words" by Miiesha
Jazz Award - "Falling" by Danny Widdicombe with Kristin Berardi and Trichotomy 
Pop Award - "Dribble" by Sycco
Regional Award - "Intentions" by Cloe Terare
Remote Award - "Twisting Words" by Miiesha
Rock Award - "Second" by Hope D
Schools (Grade 6-12) - "Over & Out" by Amber Farnan
Soul / Funk / R&B Award - "Twisting Words" by Miiesha
World Award - "The Ether" by MZAZA
Video Award - Dylan Dulcos, Rico Zhang for "Out of Touch" by Lastlings 
 
People's Choice Awards
Metro Venue of the Year - The Tivoli
Regional Venue of the Year - The NightQuarter
Festival of the Year - Woodford Folk Festival

2022 Queensland Music Awards 
The 2022 QMAs were held at Fortitude Music Hall on 29 March 2022. the nominees were announced on 24 February 2022. The winners are listed below.

Major Awards
Song of the Year - "My Ways" by Sycco 
Album of the Year - Love Signs by The Jungle Giants
Billy Thorpe Scholarship - Cloe Terare
Grant McLennan Lifetime Achievement Award - Dennis Conlin
Emerging Artist of the Year - Zheani
 
Acknowledgements
Highest Selling Single - "One Too Many" by Keith Urban and Pink
Highest Selling Album - Cry Forever by Amy Shark

Self-Nominating Awards
Blues / Roots Award - "Take Me Away" by Sue Ray
Children's Music Award - "New Shoes" by The Mini Moshers
Contemporary Classical Award - "Dreams of the Earth" by Corrina Bonshek
Country Award - "God Took His Time On You" by Casey Barnes
Electronic / Dance Award - "Foolproof" by Hayden James, Nat Dunn and Gorgon City
Folk / Singer Songwriter Award - "Crybaby" by Asha Jefferies
Heavy Award - "F... The Hollywood Cult" by Zheani
Hip Hop / Rap Award - "Okay" by iiiConic
Indigenous Award - "Letting Go" by Jem Cassar-Daley
Jazz Award - "Sonorous Figurine" by Impulse Orchestra
Pop Award - "My Ways" by Sycco
Regional / Remote Award - "Foolproof" by Hayden James, Nat Dunn and Gorgon City
Rock Award - "Most Hated Girl" by WAAX
Soul / Funk / R&B Award - "Made for Silence" by Miiesha
World Award - "Welcome to the Neighbourhood" (Taiwese: 就當家裡) by Matt Hsu's Obscure Orchestra
Video Award - "Every Single Time" by Example featuring What So Not & Lucy Lucy (directed by Macario De Souza & Allan Hardy)
Youth (ages 10-17) - "Parasite" by Paulina
 
People's Choice Awards
Metro Venue of the Year - The Tivoli
Regional Venue of the Year - NightQuarter
Festival of the Year - Airlie Beach Festival of Music

2023 Queensland Music Awards
The 2023 QMA's are scheduled to occur on 28 March 2023 at The Fortitude Music Hall.

Major Awards
Song of the Year - 
Album of the Year - 
Billy Thorpe Scholarship - 
Grant McLennan Lifetime Achievement Award -
Emerging Artist of the Year - 
 
Acknowledgements
Highest Selling Single - 
Highest Selling Album - 

Self-Nominating Awards
Blues / Roots Award -
Children's Music Award - 
Contemporary Classical Award -
Country Award - 
Electronic / Dance Award - 
Folk / Singer Songwriter Award - 
Heavy Award - 
Hip Hop / Rap Award - 
Indigenous Award - 
Jazz Award - 
Pop Award - 
Regional / Remote Award -
Rock Award - 
Soul / Funk / R&B Award - 
World Award -
Video Award - 
Youth (ages 10-17) - 
 
People's Choice Awards
Metro Venue of the Year -
Regional Venue of the Year - 
Festival of the Year -

References

External links
 [www.queenslandmusicawards.com.au Queensland Music Awards (QMA) official website]
 

Australian music awards
Awards established in 2006
2006 establishments in Australia
Annual events in Australia
Recurring events established in 2006